KNM ER 992 is a  old fossilized lower jaw discovered by Richard Leakey in 1971 at Lake Turkana, Kenya. The mandible was considered by C. Groves and V. Mazak to be the holotype specimen for Homo ergaster.

See also
 List of fossil sites (with link directory)
 List of hominina (hominin) fossils (with images)

References

External links

 
 

Homo ergaster fossils
Prehistoric Kenya